The Woman and the World is a 1916 American silent drama film starring Jeanne Eagels as a prostitute who seeks a second chance in the countryside. It was based on the 1914 play Outcast starring Elsie Ferguson. It was remade in 1922 as Outcast, starring Ferguson; in 1928 with Corinne Griffith, also titled Outcast; and with Bette Davis in 1935 as The Girl from 10th Avenue.

The film is available on DVD and online.

Cast
Jeanne Eagels as A Woman of the Streets
Boyd Marshall as The Man
Thomas A. Curran as James Palmer
Grace DeCarlton as Mrs. Jim Rollins
Wayne Arey as Jim Rollins
Carey L. Hastings as Anna Graham
Ethelmary Oakland as Sunny

References

External links

 (incorrect year of release)

1916 films
1916 drama films
American silent feature films
American black-and-white films
Films about prostitution in the United States
Films directed by Frank Lloyd
Silent American drama films
Surviving American silent films
1910s American films